Brownqueen Tunnel, also called Brown Queen Tunnel, is a railway tunnel on the Cornish Main Line between  and  stations in Cornwall, England.

Location
The tunnel is aligned approximately north-south and is on a left-hand curve and a falling gradient when travelling in the down direction.

South of the tunnel, trains pass Restormel Castle, one of the four chief Norman castles of Cornwall. To the north of the tunnel are the historic Glynn House and Bodmin Parkway station.

Construction

This is one of five tunnels on the Cornwall Railway, all of which are lined with masonry and topped by brickwork at the crown of the arch. This tunnel passes through  of hard greenstone which the builders were able to drill and blast through using nine tons of powder (because dynamite had not yet been invented).

Suicide of Silvanus Trevail
On 7 November 1903, the architect Silvanus Trevail committed suicide in the toilet of a train in the tunnel. Trevail caught the 11.40 up train from Truro, having purchased a third class ticket, a peculiar event as he typically travelled first class. At Par railway station he was witnessed leaving his seat and going to the toilet. As the train entered the Brownqueen tunnel, Trevail shot himself; when the train stopped at Bodmin Road, a porter was called, and Trevail’s body was found lying across the toilet.

Etymology
The name "Brownqueen", which applies to both the tunnel and the forest around it, is a modern corruption of the old Cornish term "Brow Gwyn", meaning "white mound". It is also spelled "brownquin", and can be translated as "white hill".

External links

 View from the tunnel top

References

Tunnels in Cornwall
Rail transport in Cornwall
Railway tunnels in England
Tunnels completed in 1859
Great Western Railway
Cornish words and phrases